Dominykas Domarkas (born April 24, 1992) is a Lithuanian professional basketball player for Hermine Nantes Basket of the Pro B.

Professional career 
Domarkas began his career with the National Basketball League (NKL) in Kaunas LKKA-Atletas. In 2015 he signed with Vytis.

On June 5, 2020, he has signed with Prienai of the Lithuanian Basketball League.

On May 26, 2021, he has signed with Astoria Bydgoszcz of the PLK.

Domarkas joined Ternopil in 2021, and averaged 10.6 points, 3.8 assists and 2.7 rebounds per game. On March 3, 2022, he has signed with Hermine Nantes Basket of the Pro B.

References

External links 
Dominykas Domarkas

Living people
1992 births
Astoria Bydgoszcz players
BC Dzūkija players
BC Pieno žvaigždės players
BC Prienai players
Lithuanian men's basketball players
LSU-Atletas basketball players
Point guards